Results from the 1978 Buenos Aires Grand Prix held at Buenos Aires on November 11, 1978, in the Autódromo Oscar Alfredo Gálvez.

Classification

References 

 
Buenos Aires Grand Prix
1978 in motorsport
1978 in Argentine motorsport
November 1978 sports events in South America